Syntomodrillia vitrea is a species of sea snail, a marine gastropod mollusk in the family Drilliidae.

Description
The length of the shell varies between 6 mm and 12 mm.

Distribution
This species occurs in the Pacific Ocean off Costa Rica and Panama.

References

 McLean & Poorman, 1971. New species of Tropical Eastern Pacific Turridae; The Veliger, 14, 89–113

External links
  Tucker, J.K. 2004 Catalog of recent and fossil turrids (Mollusca: Gastropoda). Zootaxa 682:1–1295.
 

vitrea
Gastropods described in 1971